The H. Liebes and Company Building is a commercial building located at 625 SW Broadway in southwest Portland, Oregon. It was listed on the National Register of Historic Places on September 12, 1996.

The building was designed by John Virginius Bennes.

See also
 National Register of Historic Places listings in Southwest Portland, Oregon

References

External links

1917 establishments in Oregon
Chicago school architecture in Oregon
Buildings designated early commercial in the National Register of Historic Places
National Register of Historic Places in Portland, Oregon
Southwest Portland, Oregon
Portland Historic Landmarks
Commercial buildings completed in 1917